Across the Sea of Time is a 1995 American IMAX 3D adventure film produced and directed by Stephen Low, and written by Andrew Gellis. It stars Peter Reznick as a young Russian boy who travels to the United States in search of his ancestor's family.

Plot
The plot centres around a real life Russian immigrant, searching for his family, who is given the name Leopold Minton by the Ellis Island immigration officials (because they are unable to pronounce his Russian name). Minton is employed by a company to take stereoscopic photographs for the (at that time) popular Holmes stereoscope. This provides the film with an excuse to show many stereoscopic images, both past and present, of New York.

Minton, who had no fear of heights, produced an unrivalled collection of images of the development of New York's skyscrapers. Minton also documented the construction of New York's subway system. The film also includes a number of Minton's private stereo photographs that were not publicly released during his lifetime. Some of these images reveal how Minton was able to take some of the photographs of the skyscraper construction without actually standing on them.

Cast
 Peter Reznick as Thomas Minton
 John McDonough as Freighter Chief
 Victor Steinbach as Seaman—Pilot
 Peter Boyden as ConEd Worker
 Philip Levy as Hot Dog Vendor
 Nick Muglia as Policeman
 Abby Lewis as Julia Minton
 Matt Malloy as Wall Street Businessman
 Luigi Petrozza as Pizza Pie Man
 Bernard Ferstenberg as Pickle Vendor
 Robert Buckley as Socialite
 Donald Trump as himself
 Patrick Flynn as Bartender

Music
The film's score was composed by John Barry.

 The Wonder of America
 Into New York
 Ellis Island
 Never Have I Felt So Free
 The Lower East Side
 The Automobile, The Telephone
 The Subway
 The Subway Ride
 Coney Island
 Up to the Sky
 Flight Over New York
 Central Park
 Times Square and Broadway
 Scary Night in the Park
 A New Day Will Come
 Searching
 Welcome to America, Welcome to New York
 Across the Sea of Time

Reception

Critical response
The film was a success with audiences, earning a 71% rating on review aggregator website Rotten Tomatoes based on 543 ratings, with an average of 3.1/10.

Box office
Across the Sea of Time grossed $16,015,639.

References

External links
 
 
 
 
 

1995 short films
1995 films
American drama short films
1990s English-language films
1990s Russian-language films
1990s 3D films
1990s adventure drama films
3D short films
American adventure drama films
Films scored by John Barry (composer)
Films directed by Stephen Low
IMAX short films
Columbia Pictures short films
1995 drama films
1995 multilingual films
American multilingual films
1990s American films